Leslie Chadwick (16 March 1889 – 10 October 1970) was a New Zealand cricketer. He played two first-class matches for Otago in 1919/20.

Chadwick was born at Dunedin in 1889. He worked as an accountant. His brother Charles Chadwick also played first-class matches for Otago.

References

External links
 

1889 births
1970 deaths
New Zealand cricketers
Otago cricketers
Cricketers from Dunedin